Kathryn Brenda MacGibbon-Taylor (July 31, 1944 – October 7, 2022) was a Canadian mathematician, statistician, and decision scientist. She was a professor of mathematics at the Université du Québec à Montréal and was affiliated with the Group for Research in Decision Analysis.

Education and career
MacGibbon began her career in pure mathematics, at McGill University. She earned a master's degree there in 1966, working with Michael Herschorn on differential equations, and completed a Ph.D. in 1970, with a dissertation on topology supervised by Donald A. Dawson.

As well as McGill and the Université du Québec à Montréal, she has also been affiliated with the Department of Decision Sciences and Management Information Systems at Concordia University in Montreal, where she was hired in 1986. By 1993 she had moved to the Université du Québec à Montréal.

Research
Although MacGibbon's research has covered a wide range of topics in statistics, including applications of statistics in the study of premenstrual syndrome, and the use of smart shoes to monitor the rehabilitation of patients with hip fractures, she was particularly known for her work in theoretical statistics on minimax estimators with constrained parameters.

Recognition
MacGibbon became the first woman to chair the Statistical Sciences Grant Selection Committee of the Canadian Natural Sciences and Engineering Research Council, in 1993. She was a Fellow of the Institute of Mathematical Statistics.

Personal life

MacGibbon was married to John Taylor, with whom she had 3 children. She died from complications of Alzheimer's disease and ALS on October 7, 2022, at the age of 78.

References

1944 births
2022 deaths 
Neurological disease deaths in Quebec
Canadian women mathematicians
Canadian statisticians
Women statisticians
McGill University Faculty of Science alumni
Academic staff of Concordia University
Academic staff of the Université du Québec à Montréal
Fellows of the Institute of Mathematical Statistics